The 1940–41 season was the second Scottish football season in which Dumbarton competed in regional football during World War II.

Scottish Southern League

It was the intention of the Scottish League to start up operations again this season, but after the fall of France, it was decided that the League would cease all operations until the war was over.  Nevertheless, it was left to the clubs themselves to organise themselves and to this end the clubs in the 'central belt' established the Scottish Southern League.  13 of the clubs who had played in the Western Division the previous season competed, along with Falkirk, Hearts and Hibernian, who took the places of Ayr United, Kilmarnock and Queen of the South.  Dumbarton finished 14th out of 16 with 24 points - 32 behind champions Rangers.

League Cup South

To complete the fixture list, two further competitions were introduced restricted to the 16 'South' league members.  The League Cup South was established, beginning with 4 sections of 4 teams playing on a 'home and away' basis, followed by semi finals and a final.  Unfortunately Dumbarton did not progress beyond the section prelims.

Summer Cup

Dumbarton reached the semi final before losing to eventual champions Hibernian.

Player statistics

|}

Source:

Internationalist/Representative
On 8 February 1941, Jackie Milne played for Scotland in an unofficial international match against England at Newcastle - the Scots winning 3-2.

Two weeks prior, on 25 January 1941, Milne played for an SFA Select against an Army XI, with the SFA gaining a narrow 1-0 victory.

Transfers

Players in

Players out 

In addition James Brown, John Forsyth, John Getty, John McBride, David McLean and William Nichol all played their last games in Dumbarton 'colours'.

Source:

References

Dumbarton F.C. seasons
Scottish football clubs 1940–41 season